Academia Raetica is the association and representative of the interests of the research institutions in the Canton of Graubünden, with its headquarters in Davos. It unites more than twenty member institutions. The association provides services for the promotion of scientific research and teaching in the canton of Graubünden within the framework of a performance mandate from the canton.

History 
Academia Raetica (ACAR) was founded in 2006 and represents over 20 member organizations from research and university teaching in the Canton of Graubünden. These include research institutes, universities and clinics. To provide various services to strengthen the sciences in the Canton of Graubünden, it received a performance mandate from the Canton of Graubünden from 2009 to 2013. In 2014, Academia Raetica founded the Graduate School Graubünden (GSGR) to continue the performance mandate of the canton. GSGR was integrated into Academia Raetica at the end of 2020 in favor of simple structures. The latter continues the former services of the GSGR in full.

Activities 
Target group researchers
 Organization of interdisciplinary courses and seminars 
 Organization and implementation of the biennial congress "Graubünden forscht".
 Information and communication through newsletter, social media, website and events (e.g. Science Café Graubünden)
 Arranging opportunities for work visits and internships
 Arranging access to offers at universities, central infrastructures, and services
 Welcome services for newly arrived employees of scientific institutions in the canton
 Monitoring the needs for scientific services

Target group research institutes and universities
 Organization of platforms for exchange and networking
 Support of cooperation projects 
 Support in the development of initiatives from among the scientific institutions
 Clarification of the needs and concerns of the scientific institutions
 Collection of statistical information about the scientific institutions

Target group cantonal administration and politics
 Systematic and strategic examination of the environment of research and university teaching in the canton 
 Supporting the canton in the development and implementation of education, research, and innovation strategies
 Comments on government consultations
 Mediation of expert knowledge
 Support for the presentation of funding awards to researchers

Members and partner institutions

Individual members 
Individual members of the association are natural persons who are interested in the purpose of the association. They include founding members and other members.

Research institutions 
AO Foundation, Davos
AO Education Institute, Davos
AO Research Institute, Davos
Christine Kühne – Center for Allergy Research and Education, Davos
CSEM Landquart
Institut dal Dicziunari Rumantsch Grischun, Chur
Institut für Kulturforschung Graubünden, Chur
Physikalisch-Meteorologisches Observatorium / World Radiation Center, Davos
Schweizerisches Forschungsinstitut für Hochgebirgsklima und Medizin, Davos
Swiss National Park, Zernez
Schweizerisches Institut für Allergie- und Asthmaforschung, Davos
Stiftung für Gastroenterologische Chirurgie, Davos
WSL-Institut für Schnee- und Lawinenforschung SLF, Davos

Universities, applied universities 
Fachhochschule Graubünden, Chur
Pädagogische Hochschule Graubünden, Chur
Theologische Hochschule Chur

Clinics 
Departement Chirurgie, Kantonsspital Graubünden, Chur
Departement Frauenklinik, Kantonsspital Graubünden, Chur
Departement Innere Medizin, Kantonsspital Graubünden, Chur
Hochgebirgsklinik Davos
Klinik für Neurologie und Neurorehabilitation, Kliniken Valens, Pfäfers
Klinik für Rheumatologie und muskuloskelettale Rehabilitation, Kliniken Valens, Pfäfers
Klinik Waldhaus|Psychiatrische Dienste Graubünden, Chur
Spital Davos

Partner institutions 
Davos Destinations Organisation
Engadine Health and Innovation Foundation
Frauenkulturarchiv Graubünden
Gemeinde Davos
Gemeinde Landquart
Gehirn- und Traumastiftung Graubünden
Private University in the Principality of Liechtenstein, Triesen
SUPSI, Manno/Ticino
THIM – Die internationale Hochschule für Physiotherapie, Landquart
UNESCO-Welterbe Sardona Tectonic Arena, Sargans
Wissensstadt Davos

2006 establishments in Switzerland
Organisations based in Switzerland
Research institutes in Switzerland